Kmetija 2017 is the seventh season of the Slovenian reality television series Kmetija. This is the first season since Kmetija 2011 to air on Pop TV after three seasons aired on Planet TV. The show is hosted for the first time by Natalija Bratkovič, where she has eighteen Slovenes from all over Slovenia come to the farm to compete for €75,000 and the title of Kmetija 2017. The season premiered on 11 September 2017 and conclued on 22 December 2017 where Milena Žižek won in the final duel against Maja Alič to claim the €60,000 prize after the prize dropped due to failure in some tasks, in addition to being named the winner of Kmetija 2017.

Contestants
Amongst the contestants are father Damijan Gjerkeš and his daughter Deja Gjerkeš.

The game

References

Notes

External links

The Farm (franchise)
2010s Slovenian television series